The Abbot Primate of the Order of St. Benedict serves as the elected representative of the Benedictine Confederation of monasteries in the Catholic Church. While normally possessing no authority over individual autonomous monasteries or congregations, he does serve as a liaison to the Vatican on behalf of the Benedictines, promotes unity among Benedictine monasteries and congregations, and represents Benedictines at religious gatherings throughout the world. He resides in Rome, Italy, at Sant'Anselmo all'Aventino which serves, because he is Abbot Primate, as the "Primatial Abbey of Sant'Anselmo." He appoints a Rector to oversee the College of Sant'Anselmo, serves as the "Grand Chancellor" of the Pontificio Ateneo Sant'Anselmo, and appoints a Rector to oversee the Church of Sant'Anselmo.

History
The office of "Abbot Primate" was created by Pope Leo XIII in 1893. Pope Leo had shown a particular interest in the Benedictines of the world when he sought in 1887 to reestablish the College of Sant'Anselmo in Rome as a means of serving the education of Benedictines throughout the world. Previously, the college had only served for the education of Benedictine monks from the Cassinese congregation.  Through Pope Leo's assistance, land was secured in Rome and a new complex known as "Sant'Anselmo all'Aventino" was built for this new college. It was in the papal brief on 9 December 1892 that he called for all Benedictine abbots to gather in Rome for "the laying of the foundation stone of Sant'Anselmo" that was to occur on 19 April 1893. The subsequent meetings of these abbots and their representatives after that gathering centered on how to care for the new institution and whether to elect a "Repraesentans" of the Benedictine Order for a 12 year term who would also oversee the new Sant'Anselmo.

The abbots and their representatives then met with the Pope Leo XIII on 2 May 1893 after which the Pope issued a brief on 12 July 1893 (Summum Semper) that outlined his clear vision for the Benedictines. Famously having remarked that the Benedictines were an "ordo sine ordine" (an order without order), the brief outlined the new creation of a "Benedictine Confederation." This was in keeping with the previous formation of national congregations of Benedictine monasteries that had been formed since the 13th century as a means of support for each other. Even in the 1800s autonomous monasteries had begun to join together in collaborative efforts that would see the creation of "congregations" such as the French Solesmes Congregation in 1837, the American-Cassinese Congregation in 1855, the Beuronese Congregation in 1868, the Subiaco Congregation in 1872, and the Swiss-American Congregation in 1881. Each "congregation" would have its own constitution and elect its own "Abbot President." While commendable, Pope Leo sought to address the further reality that the "congregations existed side by side without any bond between them, or any semblance of a central authority." Therefore, the Pope followed a similar plan with the creation of this new international Benedictine Confederation that incorporated all the congregations without a loss of autonomy for any abbey or congregation.

On the question of leadership for this new international confederation, the Pope and the Benedictine abbots had differed because the abbots had wanted a leadership with no control over the autonomous abbeys and congregations. Their proposal was for a mere "representative" that could at least be able to also oversee the new international College of Sant'Anselmo. While Pope Leo was amenable to most of their other proposals, on this one issue of leadership he differed. As one historian noted, "instead of the consciously understated title of Repraesentans for the symbolic head of the Confederation, the pope wished that the clearer title of Primas be used."

After the papal brief of 2 May 1893 established this new Benedictine Confederation with its Abbot Primate, the Vatican followed this with a decree in September 1893 (Inaestimabilis) that set-out the specific rights and function of the Abbot Primate. Firstly, the Abbot Primate would reside in Rome to serve as the Abbot of the new complex known as the Primatial Abbey of Sant'Anselmo representing Benedictines "for businesses directly concerning the well-being of the whole order." This was, as many historians have noted, his primary responsibility. He would be elected for a twelve year term by the Benedictine abbots of the world and would have limited administrative or juridical control over individual monasteries or congregations, but would still serve to represent Benedictines to the Vatican and to the world. Next, he would serve as the "Grand Chancellor" of the newly reestablished College of Sant'Anselmo where he would govern the work on behalf of the Benedictine Confederation.

It seems clear to most historians that Pope Leo XIII at least initially envisioned establishing a superior for the Benedictines to function like those of other religious orders such as the Jesuits, Franciscans, or Dominicans. Instead, by establishing the office of the "Abbot Primate" he was willing to compromise on this vision given the concerns of the Benedictine abbots about the historic autonomy of monasteries. As one historian noted, "Pope XIII acquiesced in the abbots' thwarting his original intentions to organize a more central authority for the 'Black Monks'." Thus, "Summum Semper" of 1893 crafted a careful balance in all these needs as noted by another historian: 

Today, the Benedictine Confederation is governed by its own Vatican approved constitution known as a "Lex Propria" that has been updated at various times and it, too, would outline the rights and function of the Abbot Primate. This lex propria is grounded in the founding documents of "Summum Semper" and "Inaestimabilis" but allows for the flexibility of emendations and provisions proposed by the Congress of Abbots and approved by the Vatican. A more detailed analysis of the development and evolution of the lex propria is not offered here, but this guiding constitutional document outlines the rights and responsibilities for the Abbot Primate, the College of Abbots, the Benedictine Confederation, the Pontificio Sant'Anselmo, and the College of Sant'Anselmo.

Benedictine institutions overseen by the Abbot Primate

While the Abbot Primate has minimal juridical authority over individual monasteries or congregations (unless they are one of the very few non-congregational monasteries), he does direct the work of Sant'Anselmo on the Aventine. This is the complex located on the Aventine Hill in Rome's Ripa rione and overseen by the Benedictine Confederation in the person of the Abbot Primate and the Synod of Abbot Presidents. This complex is sometimes referred to as the "Primatial Abbey of Sant'Anselmo" because the Abbot Primate resides there as Abbot and he appoints a "Prior" to serve on his behalf. The complex comprises the "College of Sant'Anselmo", the "Pontifical Athenaeum of Saint Anselm", the Church of Sant'Anselmo, and serves as the curial headquarters of the Confederation and Abbot Primate. The current Abbot Primate is Abbot Gregory Polan, O.S.B. and his appointed Prior is Rev. Mauritius Wilde, O.S.B.

College of Sant’Anselmo 
The ecclesiastical residential College of Sant'Anselmo is juridically considered the successor of the homonymous college of the Cassinese Benedictine Congregation which was founded in 1687. The present college was reestablished in 1887 and moved to the newly constructed "Sant'Anselmo" on the Aventine Hill in 1896. Today the residential college houses an average of one hundred Benedictine monks from about forty countries, as well as other religious, diocesan priests, and lay people. As a house of formation, it offers a monastic environment for those who study at the onsite Pontifical Athenaeum of Saint Anselm or at other Roman pontifical universities. When the Abbot Primate appoints his Prior, this monk also serves concurrently as the Rector of the college. The present Rector is Rev. Mauritius Wilde, O.S.B.

Pontifical Athenaeum of Sant'Anselmo 
The Anselmianum, also known as the Pontifical Athenaeum of Saint Anselm, is the pontifical university in Rome associated with the Benedictines. The institution includes faculties of Philosophy, Theology (Sacramental Theology, Monastic Studies), the Institute of Historical Theology, as well as the Pontifical Institute of Liturgy. It grants certificates and diplomas in various subjects, as well as Bachelor, Licentiate, and Doctoral degrees. Originally the university exclusively served only Benedictines, but now is open to external students. The Abbot Primate is officially the "Grand Chancellor" of the Athenaeum and the present Rector of the Athenaeum is Rev. Bernhard A. Eckerstorfer, O.S.B.

Church of Sant'Anselmo 
The Church which was consecrated on 11 November 1900 and is constructed of three naves, divided by granite columns, and includes one main altar and two side altars. A large section on the east and west ends near the apse includes the traditional stalls for the monastic choir. The church serves as a place of worship for the Benedictine residential college community and the students of the Athenaeum. It is also known, especially to the Romans, for the performances of Gregorian chant offered by the monks during the Sunday liturgical celebrations of Vespers. Since 1962, the church has also been the starting point of the penitential procession presided over by the Pope on Ash Wednesday, and which ends at the basilica of Santa Sabina where the first stationary mass of Lent is celebrated. The Abbot Primate has appointed the Rev. Doroteo Toić, O.S.B. as the present Rector of the church.

List of Abbots Primate

References

External links
The Benedictine Confederation of Congregations of Monasteries of the Order of Saint Benedict (official website)
International Atlas of Benedictine Monasteries
Collegio Sant'Anselmo (in Italian and English)
Pontificio Ateneo Sant'Anselmo (in Italian and English)
Chiesa Sant'Anselmo (in Italian and English)

Benedictine Confederation
Abbots Primate